Duador may refer to:

 A brand name pharmaceutical drug containing albendazole
 A synonym for the muscle relaxant dihydrochandonium